The Devil and the Smalander (Swedish: Hin och smålänningen) is a 1927 Swedish silent drama film directed by and starring Erik A. Petschler and also featuring Thor Modéen, Jenny Tschernichin-Larsson and Emmy Albiin. It was remade as a 1949 sound film of the same title.

Cast
 Erik A. Petschler as 	von Zaaten
 Thor Modéen as 	Gunnar Rask
 Emmy Albiin as 	Malena Hansson
 Greta Anjou as 	Elna
 Ragnar Arvedson as Casimir von Suckten
 Nils Aréhn as 	Mr. Bernfeldt
 Sam Ask as 	Bark
 Agnes Clementsson as 	Mrs Wässman
 Anita Dorr as 	Margit Bernfeldt
 John Melin as 	Länk
 Axel Ringvall as 	Wässman
 Birgit Tengroth as 	A girl
 Jenny Tschernichin-Larsson as 	Titta Grå
 Gideon Wahlberg as 	Navvy
 Nils Wahlbom as Man at police station
 Tom Walter as Servant
 Olof Ås as Hjortberg

References

Bibliography
 Qvist, Per Olov & von Bagh, Peter. Guide to the Cinema of Sweden and Finland. Greenwood Publishing Group, 2000.

External links

1927 films
1927 drama films
Swedish drama films
Swedish silent feature films
Swedish black-and-white films
Films directed by Erik A. Petschler
Silent drama films
1920s Swedish films